Osvaldo José Piazza (born 6 April 1947) is an Argentine professional football manager and former player. In his playing days, he was a defender.

Biography
He arrived at AS Saint-Étienne, in 1972, replacing new coach Robert Herbin at fullback position. He was associated with Christian Lopez and had the habit to help the team offensively. He won many titles with AS Saint-Étienne. He was very popular at this time, and Bernard Sauvat wrote a song dedicated to him. Piazza earned 15 caps for Argentina, but could not participate to 1978 FIFA World Cup in his country due to family problems even though César Luis Menotti wanted him in the squad. In 1979, he played for Club Atlético Vélez Sársfield, before returning to France with Corbeil-Essonnes, as a player-coach but it was a failure.

Titles

Player 
 French championship in 1974, 1975, and 1976 with AS Saint-Étienne
 Coupe de France 1974, 1975, and 1977 with AS Saint-Étienne
 European Cup runner-up in  1976 with AS Saint-Étienne

Manager 
 Primera División Argentina: 1995 (Apertura, opening championship), 1996 (Clausura, ending championship)
 Liga Paraguaya: Primera División" 1993
 Primera División Peruana: 1998
 Supercopa Sudamericana: 1996

References

External links

 
 Lyrics of Mon Copain l'Argentin by Bernard Sauvat (song dedicated to Oswaldo Piazza)

1947 births
Living people
Footballers from Buenos Aires
Argentine footballers
Argentina international footballers
Argentine expatriate footballers
Association football defenders
Club Atlético Lanús footballers
Club Atlético Vélez Sarsfield footballers
AS Saint-Étienne players
Club Universitario de Deportes managers
Argentine Primera División players
Ligue 1 players
Expatriate footballers in France
Argentine expatriate sportspeople in France
Argentine football managers
Club Olimpia managers
Club Atlético Vélez Sarsfield managers
Club Atlético Independiente managers
Club Atlético Huracán managers
Atlético de Rafaela managers
Expatriate football managers in Peru
Argentine expatriate sportspeople in Paraguay
Expatriate football managers in Paraguay
Boca Juniors managers
Association football player-managers
AS Corbeil-Essonnes (football) managers
AS Corbeil-Essonnes (football) players